"I, Too" is a poem written by Langston Hughes that shows a want for equality through patience whilst going against the idea that patriotism is limited by race. It was first published in Hughes' first volume of poetry, The Weary Blues in 1926. This poem, along with other works by Hughes, helped define the Harlem Renaissance, a period in the early 1920s and '30s of newfound cultural identity for blacks in America who had discovered the power of literature, art, music, and poetry as a means of personal and collective expression in the scope of civil rights.
In the poem, Hughes describes a ubiquitous racial oppression that degrades African Americans at the time. He writes from the perspective of an inferior servant to a domineering white family that shoos him away to the kitchen whenever company arrives.

Hughes ties together the sense of the unity that U.S. President Abraham Lincoln spoke about regarding the separate and diverse parts of the American democracy (the coexistence of slavery and freedom) by referencing Walter Whitman's poem  "I Hear America Singing".

Text

References

External links 

 "I, Too" by Langston Hughes from the Poetry Foundation.

Poetry by Langston Hughes